Monster Collection (モンスター・コレクション. otherwise known as Mon-Colle (モンコレ)) is an out-of-print trading card game developed by Group SNE. Monster Collection was first published in 1997 by Fujimi Shobo. In 2000, Monster Collection 2 was released. It was acquired by Bushiroad in August 2011.

Monster Collection was later expanded to a roleplaying game and was the basis for the anime series Mon Colle Knights.

The Monster Collection game universe is a world connected to six gates of fire, water, earth, wind, good, and evil, representing East, South, West, North, Heaven and Earth.  Player acts as a summoner, which engages in combat using summoned monsters.

Rules
The game is a one-on-one card game, set in a 3×4 grid. One side declared as winner by capturing opponent's headquarter.

Each monster has fire, water, earth, wind, good, or evil element. A monster's ability is decided by battle spell, unit's equipment, combat items, and terrain.

Adaptations

Comic
 Monster Collection (by Sei Itoh)
 Monster Collection Demon heart
 Mon-Colle Monster

Video game
 Monster Collection: Sorcerer's Mask (PlayStation) 
 Monster Collection Board Game (PC) 
 Monster Collection Trading card game The Millennium (PC)

TV series
 Mon Colle Knights

Trivia
 Ryūsuke Mita, the creator of Dragon Half, worked as the designer for the Monster collection card game

References

External links
 Bushiroad's Monster Collection page
 Group SNE's Monster Collection home page

Bushiroad
Card games introduced in 1997
Collectible card games